Abhijit Roy is an Indian politician from All India Trinamool Congress. In May 2016, he was elected as the member of the West Bengal Legislative Assembly from Mayureswar (Vidhan Sabha constituency). He won the election.

References

Living people
Year of birth missing (living people)